The Captain John T. Warner House is a historic house at 822 East College Street in Batesville, Arkansas.  It is a -story wood-frame structure with a side-gable roof and clapboarded exterior.  It has a gabled dormer at the center of the roof, with vernacular Eastlake style decoration.  The house was built in 1879 by Captain John Warner.  Warner was a prominent figure in local business and politics, serving as mayor of Batesville.  He was instrumental in bringing about the electrification and provisioning of municipal water to the community.

The house was listed on the National Register of Historic Places in 1982.

See also
National Register of Historic Places listings in Independence County, Arkansas

References

Houses on the National Register of Historic Places in Arkansas
National Register of Historic Places in Independence County, Arkansas
Stick-Eastlake architecture in the United States
Houses completed in 1879
Houses in Independence County, Arkansas
1879 establishments in Arkansas